Battram is a hamlet forming part of the Ibstock civil parish in North West Leicestershire, England.

Battram is named after Johnny Battram, who had the original cottage, but very much expanded with the coming of coal mining in the area. The village was in the shadow of Nailstone pit and not far from the Ellistown and Ibstock Collieries. Nailstone is in the National Forest and has a newly planted wood on its eastern side.

Hamlets in Leicestershire
North West Leicestershire District